Mechelen railway station, officially Mechelen, is a railway station in Mechelen, Antwerp, Belgium. The station opened on 5 May 1835 on railway lines 25, 27 and 53. Train services are operated by the National Railway Company of Belgium (NMBS/SNCB).

History
On 5 May 1835, the first public train journey on the European mainland arrived near the station. The train line stopped just south of the station, as there was no bridge over the canal until 1836. Lines were built in all directions from the station: North to Antwerp, south to Brussels and France, east to Leuven, Liège and Verviers and west to Dendermonde, Ghent, Bruges and Ostend.

In 2013, major plans to modernise and rebuild the station started. This project is called Mechelen in Beweging. A 3-level underground car park has since been constructed. The current station buildings and tracks will be demolished and replaced. The building work is expected to take more than a decade as the work will need to be carried out platform by platform to retain enough capacity for the station.

Features
The station has twelve platforms; the six on the eastern side are a few metres higher than the others. In 2012, a new high-speed railway (line 25N) opened between Mechelen and Schaerbeek, in northern Brussels. This line also links Mechelen with Brussels Airport. Platforms 11 and 12 were added to the station in December 2020 to accommodate the additional trains from this line.

To the east of the station is the large Mechelen Train Works, where trains receive maintenance and heavy works, such as refurbishment.

Train services
The following services currently serve the station:

Intercity services (IC-05) Antwerp - Mechelen - Brussels - Nivelles - Charleroi
Intercity services (IC-08) Antwerp - Mechelen - Brussels Airport - Leuven - Hasselt
Intercity services (IC-11) Binche - Braine-le-Comte - Halle - Brussels - Mechelen - Turnhout (weekdays)
Intercity services (IC-21) Ghent - Dendermonde - Mechelen - Leuven
Intercity services (IC-22) Essen - Antwerp - Mechelen - Brussels (weekdays)
Intercity services (IC-22) Antwerp - Mechelen - Brussels - Halle - Braine-le-Comte - Binche (weekends)
Intercity services (IC-31) Antwerp - Mechelen - Brussels (weekdays)
Intercity services (IC-31) Antwerp - Mechelen - Brussels - Nivelles - Charleroi (weekends)
Intercity services (IC-35) Amsterdam - The Hague - Rotterdam - Roosendaal - Antwerp - Brussels Airport - Brussels
Local services (L-02) Zeebrugge - Bruges – Ghent – Dendermonde – Mechelen (weekdays)
Local services (L-20) Sint-Niklaas – Mechelen – Leuven (weekdays)
Local services (L-20) Mechelen - Leuven (weekends)
Local services (L-27) Sint-Niklaas - Mechelen (weekends)
Local services (L-28) Ghent - Dendermonde - Mechelen (weekends)
Brussels RER services (S1) Antwerp - Mechelen - Brussels - Waterloo - Nivelles (weekdays)
Brussels RER services (S1) Antwerp - Mechelen - Brussels (weekends)
Brussels RER services (S5) Mechelen - Brussels-Luxembourg - Etterbeek - Halle - Enghien (- Geraardsbergen)
Brussels RER services (S7) Mechelen - Merode - Halle

See also
 List of railway stations in Belgium

References

Notes

Bibliography

External links
 Mechelen railway station at Belgian Railways website

Railway stations in Belgium
Railway stations in Antwerp Province
Buildings and structures in Mechelen
Railway stations in Belgium opened in 1835